Five male athletes from Moldova competed at the 1996 Summer Paralympics in Atlanta, United States. Nikolai Tchoumak earned a bronze medal in the men's 10,000m T12 and Vladimir Polkanov won a bronze medal in the men's singles 8 in table tennis.

Medalist table

See also
Moldova at the Paralympics
Moldova at the 1996 Summer Olympics

References 

Nations at the 1996 Summer Paralympics
1996
Summer Paralympics